A barb is one of various ray-finned fish species in a non-phylogenetic group, with members in the family Cyprinidae, and especially the genera Barbus and Puntius, but many others also. They were formerly united with the barbels in the subfamily Barbinae but that group is paraphyletic with the Cyprininae. If the Labeoninae are recognized as distinct, many small African "barbs" would probably, however, warrant recognition as a new subfamily.

The root of the word "barb" is common in cyprinid names of European languages, from the Latin barba ("beard") (COD):
 barb from Catalan
 barbi from Finnish
 barbo from Spanish
 barbeau from French 
 barbo from Italian
and many others. This is in reference to the barbels which are prominently seen around the mouth of many "barbs".

Genera
Genera that contain species with common names including "barb":

 Barbichthys
 Barbodes
 Barboides
 Barbonymus – tinfoil barbs
 Barbopsis
 Barbus – typical barbels (and provisionally African barbs)
 Caecobarbus
 Capoeta
 Carasobarbus
 Catla
 Catlocarpio
 Chela (fish)
 Coptostomabarbus
 Cyclocheilichthys
 Discherodontus
 Hypselobarbus
 Hypsibarbus 
 Labeobarbus
 Leptobarbus
 Luciobarbus (may belong in Barbus)
 Messinobarbus (may belong in Barbus)
 Megarasbora
 Osteochilus
 Poropuntius
 Probarbus
 Puntioplites
 Puntius
 Sawbwa – Sawbwa Barb

See also
 Barbel (fish)

Footnotes

References
  (2007): Evolutionary origin of Lake Tana's (Ethiopia) small Barbus species: indications of rapid ecological divergence and speciation. Anim. Biol. 57(1): 39-48.  (HTML abstract)

External links

 
Fish common names